In geometry, the cyclohedron is a -dimensional polytope where  can be any non-negative integer. It was first introduced as a combinatorial object by Raoul Bott and Clifford Taubes and, for this reason, it is also sometimes called the Bott–Taubes polytope. It was later constructed as a polytope by Martin Markl and by Rodica Simion. Rodica Simion describes this polytope as an associahedron of type B.

The cyclohedron is useful in studying knot invariants.

Construction

Cyclohedra belong to several larger families of polytopes, each providing a general construction. For instance, the cyclohedron belongs to the generalized associahedra that arise from cluster algebra, and to the graph-associahedra, a family of polytopes each corresponding to a graph. In the latter family, the graph corresponding to the -dimensional cyclohedron is a cycle on  vertices.

In topological terms, the configuration space of  distinct points on the circle  is a -dimensional manifold, which can be compactified into a manifold with corners by allowing the points to approach each other.

Just as the associahedron, the cyclohedron can be recovered by removing some of the facets of the permutohedron.

Properties

The graph made up of the vertices and edges of the -dimensional cyclohedron is the flip graph of the centrally symmetric triangulations of a convex polygon with  vertices. When  goes to infinity, the asymptotic behavior of the diameter  of that graph is given by

.

See also
Associahedron
Permutohedron
Permutoassociahedron

References

Further reading

External links

Polytopes